The 1927 Syracuse Orangemen football team represented Syracuse University in the 1927 college football season. The Orangemen were led by first-year head coach Lew Andreas and played their home games at Archbold Stadium in Syracuse, New York. Team captain and fullback Ray Barbuti was also captain of Syracuse's athletics team, and he won two gold medals in sprinting at the 1928 Summer Olympics.

Schedule

References

Syracuse
Syracuse Orange football seasons
Syracuse Orangemen football